Balla or Valla (Οὐάλλαι) was a town of ancient Macedonia, on the Haliacmon river, south of Phylace, placed in Pieria by Ptolemy and Pliny, the inhabitants of which were removed to Pythium. As Pythium was in Perrhaebia, at the southwestern foot of the Pierian mountains, 19th century archaeologist William Martin Leake placed Balla in the mountainous part of Pieria, and supposed that Velventos may have derived its name from it. In that case it would be a different place from the "Bala" of the Peutinger Table, which stood about midway between Dium and Berrhoea.

Modern scholars treat its site as unlocated.

References

The Macedonian State By N. G. L. Hammond pages 157, 385 

Populated places in ancient Macedonia
Geography of ancient Pieria
Former populated places in Greece
Lost ancient cities and towns